S. Vasantha Kumar   was the third Bishop of Karnataka of the Church of South India.

Further reading
 
Notes

 

20th-century Anglican bishops in India
Senate of Serampore College (University) alumni
Church of South India clergy
Indian bishops
Indian Christian religious leaders
Western Theological Seminary alumni
Anglican bishops of Karnataka Central